Kosor is a surname. Notable persons with that surname include:

 Darinko Kosor (born 1965), Croatian politician
 Jadranka Kosor (born 1953), Croatian politician and prime minister
 Josip Kosor (1879–1961), Croatian novelist and playwright

Croatian surnames